Picabo  is an unincorporated community in Blaine County, Idaho, United States.

Description

It has a gas station, country store, post office, and a small airport. The community is surrounded by large ranches and irrigated fields. The 2000 United States census for this ZIP Code shows a population of 128 in 56 housing units in 104 km2 (40 square miles).

The nearest flowing stream is Silver Creek, a scenic spring-fed tributary of the Little Wood River, a key source of irrigation water for eastern Blaine County. The pristine Silver Creek is renowned among fly fisherman and was a favorite of Ernest Hemingway, who enjoyed hunting and fishing along the stream with local rancher, Bud Purdy.

Name
The name "Picabo" supposedly derives from a Native American term translated as "silver water". The name "Picabo" was made familiar by Picabo Street, an Olympic skier who grew up in nearby Triumph.

References

External links

 Silver Creek Preserve
 Blaine County, Idaho

Unincorporated communities in Idaho
Unincorporated communities in Blaine County, Idaho